De Mi Puño y Letra is a studio album recorded by Venezuelan singer-songwriter Carlos Baute. The album was released by Warner Music Spain on April 1, 2008 and re-released on June 30, 2009. It was recorded between Mexico City and Los Angeles and produced by Juan Carlos Moguel and Armándo Ávila, who has also worked with RBD and La Quinta Estación.

It features Venezuelan musician and multi-instrumentalist Franco de Vita on the song "Nada Se Compara A Ti". It is the first time Baute had collaborated with the artist, who had a very successful career on the mid-1990s and is also known as the author of hits like Ricky Martin's "Vuelve" and Chayanne's "Contra Vientos y Mareas". On the deluxe edition, Spanish singer Marta Sanchez is featured on a new version "Colgando En Tus Manos".

Three singles were released from the album. The first single, "Colgando En Tus Manos" became a worldwide hit, mainly its re-release featuring Marta Sanchez. Second single "Tu No Sabes Que Tanto" became a moderate hit in most Latin markets. Third single, "Nada Se Compara A Ti" became a hit in Latin airplay charts, but failed to chart in the United States.

De Mi Puño y Letra became a commercial success for Baute. It reached No.11 on the Billboard Latin Pop Albums chart, his highest entry to date. On Spain, the album reached No.2 and received a Platinum certification for 60,000 copies sold. It also reached No.22 on Mexico and received a Gold certification for 40,000 copies sold.

Singles
Three singles were released from the album. The first single, "Colgando En Tus Manos" was first released in August 2008 as the solo version included in the album. The song was later re-released as a new version featuring Marta Sanchez, and became a huge commercial hit, topping the charts on many Latin American countries. In Spain, it reached No.1 for 27 weeks, and in the United States, it reached No.4 on the Billboard Latin Songs chart, and No.1 on the Latin Pop Songs component chart. It ultimately became the biggest hit in Baute's career.

The second single, "Tu No Sabes Que Tanto", reached No. 28 on the Latin Songs chart. It also reached No.17 on the Latin Pop Songs component chart. "Nada Se Compara a Ti", featuring Franco de Vita, reached No.29 on the Spanish Singles Chart. It failed to chart on the United States.

Track listing
Standard Edition

Personnel

Miguel Alonso Alcántara – viola
Laura Álvarez – violin
Consuelo Aquino – violin
Enriqueta Arrellanes – violin
Armando Ávila – mixing
Javier Barrera – drums
Carlos Baute – arrangements, composer, chorus
Hugo Boss – wardrobe
Luis Bustamante – arrangements, chorus
Francisco Cedillo – viola
Karina Cortez – violin
Tom Coyne – mastering
Franco De Vita – chorus
Marta Sánchez – chorus
Celio González – cencerro, conga, laudes, timbales, udu
Alan Lerma – violin
Gloria López – violin
Humberto Lopez – violin
Rafael López – violin
Juan Carlos Moguel – arrangements, chorus, Hammond B3, mellotron, piano, producer, remixing
Ricardo "Lemoc" Morales – chorus
John Paterno –	mixing
Erika Ramírez – viola
Judith Reyes –	viola
Franklin Rivero – chorus, management
Stephany Ruis – chorus
Erick E. Sanchez – violin
Guillermo "Willy" Trejo – tres cubano
Guillermo Uribe – violin
Karlos Valdes – arrangements, chorus

Source: Allmusic

Chart performance
De Mi Puño y Letra became a commercial success for Baute. It reached No.11 on the Billboard Latin Pop Albums chart, his highest entry to date. On Spain, the album reached No.2 and received a Platinum certification for 60,000 copies sold. It also reached No.8 on Mexico and received a Gold certification for 40,000 copies sold.

Weekly charts

Yearly charts

Certifications

Release history

References

2008 albums
Warner Music Group albums
Carlos Baute albums
Spanish-language albums